"Me, Myself and I" is a song by American singer-songwriter Vitamin C, released as a single on October 19, 1999. Written by Gregg Rolie, Michael John Carabello, and Thomas Coke Escovedo, it was the second single released from Vitamin C's 1999 debut album, Vitamin C. The chorus contains a sample from the Santana song "No One to Depend On", from their 1971 Santana III album.

Reception
Despite the highly positive acclaim towards the song, and though the single never entered the US Billboard Hot 100, the song peaked at number 36 on the Top 40 Mainstream chart and number 20 on the Bubbling Under Hot 100 Singles chart.

Music video
The music video for the song was directed by Nigel Dick and features Johnny Knoxville.

Track listings
US CD and cassette single
 "Me, Myself and I" (radio edit) – 3:47
 "Money" (album version) – 3:45

German CD single
 "Me, Myself and I" (radio edit) – 3:48
 "Me, Myself and I" (Pablo Flores Miami Mix radio edit) – 4:36
 "Me, Myself and I" (Jonathan Peters radio edit) – 4:00

Charts

References

Vitamin C (singer) songs
1999 singles
1999 songs
Elektra Records singles
Music videos directed by Nigel Dick
Songs written by Gregg Rolie